Natavan Gasimova (born 8 July 1985, in Nakhchivan, Azerbaijan SSR) is an Azerbaijani indoor volleyball player of Azeryol Baku from Azerbaijan.

Gasimova is a current member of the Azerbaijan women's national volleyball team.

Clubs
 Azerrail Baku (2004–2011)
 Scavolini Pesaro (2011)
 VC Baku (2011–2012)
 Azeryol Baku (2012–)

Awards

Club
 '2004–05 Azerbaijan Women's Volleyball Super League -  Champion, with Azerrail Baku
 '2005–06 Azerbaijan Women's Volleyball Super League -  Champion, with Azerrail Baku
 '2006–07 Azerbaijan Women's Volleyball Super League -  Champion, with Azerrail Baku
 '2007–08 Azerbaijan Women's Volleyball Super League -  Champion, with Azerrail Baku
 '2011–12 Challenge Cup -  Runner-Up, with VC Baku
 '2013–14 Azerbaijan Women's Volleyball Super League -  Runner-Up, with Azeryol Baku

See also
Azeryol Baku
Azerbaijan women's national volleyball team

References

1985 births
Living people
Guliyev, Rasul
Azerbaijani women's volleyball players
European Games competitors for Azerbaijan
Volleyball players at the 2015 European Games
Setters (volleyball)
Azerbaijani expatriate sportspeople in Italy
Expatriate volleyball players in Italy